Manuel Fernando Gonilho Matias (born 30 March 1962 in Alfundão, Ferreira do Alentejo) is a retired long-distance runner from Portugal, who won the 1989 edition of the Fukuoka Marathon, clocking 2:12:54 on 3 December 1989. A year earlier he triumphed in the Paris Marathon. Matias represented his native country at the 1996 Summer Olympics in Atlanta, Georgia, finishing in 46th place (2:20:58).

He won the City-Pier-City Loop half marathon in the Hague in 1992.

Achievements

References
 1989 Year Ranking
 

1962 births
Living people
Place of birth missing (living people)
Portuguese male long-distance runners
Portuguese male marathon runners
Olympic male marathon runners
Olympic athletes of Portugal
Athletes (track and field) at the 1996 Summer Olympics
Japan Championships in Athletics winners
Paris Marathon male winners
Sportspeople from Beja District